{{Taxobox
| image = EuropäischenZweiflügeligen1790TafCXCII.jpg
| image_caption = Thereva unica as  bipunctata in Meigen Europäischen Zweiflügeligen fig 1
| regnum = Animalia
| phylum = Arthropoda
| classis = Insecta
| ordo = Diptera
| familia = Therevidae
| genus = Thereva| species =  T. unica| binomial = Thereva unica| binomial_authority =  (Harris, 1780)
| synonyms = Neothereva hermaphrodita Becker, 1922Thereva vulpina Krober, 1912Neothereva frontata Krober, 1912Thereva bipunctata Meigen, 1820Thereva albipennis Meigen, 1820Thereva albilabris Meigen, 1820Bibio lugubris* Fabricius, 1787
}}Thereva unica'' is a Palearctic species of stiletto fly in the family Therevidae.

References

External links
Images representing  Thereva unica

Therevidae
Insects described in 1780